Wonders of Life is a 2013 television documentary series presented by physicist Brian Cox. The series was produced by the BBC and Chinese state television network CCTV-9 and aired in the United Kingdom from 27 January 2013 at 9:00 pm on BBC Two. An accompanying book with the same title was also published.

Episodes

1. "What is Life?"
Brian Cox journeys to Southeast Asia to see how life began on Earth and how the flow of energy created and supports life.

2. "Expanding Universe"
In the second episode, Brian travels to the U.S. to showcase how the laws of science allowed senses to arise.

3. "Endless Forms Most Beautiful"
Brian travels to Africa and Madagascar to analyse why Earth is a fertile place and how it allows complex life to exist.

4. "Size Matters"
The fourth episode sees Brian in Australia, looking at how the size of each plant and animal affects how long it can survive.

5. "Home"
In the final episode, Cox travels to Mexico to explain what makes Earth a home for life and ask what ingredients were required for complex life to begin.

Merchandise
The Region 2 DVD discs were released on 4 March 2013.

A book related to the series was authored by Andrew Cohen and Brian Cox. The book was published on 24 January 2013.

See also
Wonders of the Solar System
Wonders of the Universe
Human Universe
Forces of Nature (TV series)

References

External links
 
 

2013 British television series debuts
2013 British television series endings
BBC high definition shows
BBC television documentaries about science
English-language television shows